Unorganized South Nipissing District is an unorganized area in north-central Ontario, in the District of Nipissing. It is almost entirely within and includes most of Algonquin Provincial Park.

Localities
Localities located within the unorganized area are:

Communities

Acanthus
Achray
Brent
Canoe Lake
Coristine
Daventry
Government Park
Kilrush
Kiosk
Lake Traverse
Mink Lake
Odenback
Radiant
Stuart

Townships
The following geographic townships are included:

Anglin
Ballantyne
Barron
Biggar
Bishop
Boulter 
Bower
Boyd 
Bronson
Butt
Canisbay
Clancy
Deacon
Devine
Dickson
Edgar
Finlayson 
Fitzgerald
Freswick
Guthrie
Hunter
Lauder
Lister
Master
McCraney
McLaughlin
Niven
Osler
Paxton
Peck
Pentland
Preston
Sproule
Stratton
White
Wilkes

All, except Boulter, Lauder, and parts of Ballantyne, Boyd and Paxton are within Algonquin Provincial Park.

Demographics

Population distribution
Most of the population lives outside of Algonquin Park on the northern or northwestern fringes of the region. According to the 2016 Census, the blocks that encompass the Townships of Boulter, Lauder, Pentland and Boyd had a combined population of 57. The area around Loxton Lake in Ballantyne Township (Census Block 35480228012) had a population of 26. Census Block 35480228215 which covers parts of Bronson and Stratton Townships in the Northeast corner of Algonquin Park had a population of 5, while 15 people lived in Census Block 35480228146 which covers most of the western part of the region.

See also
List of townships in Ontario

References

External links

Geography of Nipissing District
Nipissing South